NCAA Men's Division I Outdoor Track and Field Championships
 NCAA Women's Division I Outdoor Track and Field Championships